Heroic Expeditions is a 1981 fantasy role-playing game adventure published by Judges Guild.

Contents
Heroic Expeditions presents three separate quests designed for three specific sets of characters: "Spear of Darkness," "Quest for the Book of Ancestry," and "Cave of Despair".

Reception
J. David George reviewed Heroic Expeditions in The Space Gamer No. 50. George commented that "Any of these three quests could have been interesting, were they given more background and published separately in a more complete form.  "Cave," the best of the three, can only be described as almost clever.  For the most part, even novice referees would be better off designing their own quests than using those presented in Heroic Expeditions."

See also 

 Tower of Ulission, 1980
 Lara's Tower, 1981
 Caves and Caverns, 1982

References

Judges Guild fantasy role-playing game adventures
Role-playing game supplements introduced in 1981